One More River is a 1933 novel by the British writer John Galsworthy. It was the final book in the Forsyte Chronicles, an extended series of novels of which The Forsyte Saga are the best known.

Film adaptation
The following year it was adapted into a film of the same title by Universal Pictures. Directed by James Whale it starred Diana Wynyard, Colin Clive and Frank Lawton.

References

Bibliography
 Gindin, James. John Galsworthy's Life and Art: An Alien's Fortress. Springer, 1987.
 Goble, Alan. The Complete Index to Literary Sources in Film. Walter de Gruyter, 1999.

1933 British novels
Novels by John Galsworthy
Novels set in England
British novels adapted into films
Heinemann (publisher) books
Charles Scribner's Sons books